The Racing Strain may refer to:

The Racing Strain (1918 film), an American film directed by Emmett J. Flynn
The Racing Strain (1932 film), an American film directed by Jerome Storm